Taylor County is a county located in the west central portion of the U.S. state of Georgia. As of the 2020 census, the population was 7,816. The county seat and largest city is Butler.

History
Taylor County was created on January 15, 1852, by an act of the Georgia General Assembly from portions of Macon, Marion and Talbot counties. The County is named for Zachary Taylor, twelfth President of the United States.

Taylor County is also widely known for its history of racism and Jim Crow era subjugation of its African-American populace, which continued long into the 20th century. An especially egregious case is the 1946 lynching of Maceo Snipes, a World War II veteran and the first African-American to vote in Taylor County, for which he was murdered by the KKK on his doorstep in the hours following. Although not immediately succumbing to his wounds, Mr. Snipes death was eventually caused by the lack of availability of "black blood", or transfusions from a black person, at a Butler, Georgia hospital to which he was forced to walk three miles with gunshot wounds to his back. The murderers were never tried or otherwise held to account for their crimes, despite the involvement of the FBI. Mr. Snipes' murder was a motivating factor in Martin Luther King, Jr.'s first and only letter to the Atlanta Constitution at age 17, decrying the terrorism experienced by black citizens in the state at that time, which occurred largely at the hands of or with the blessing of the local and state authorities.

Geography

Taylor County is dissected by the Fall Line geological formation. The upper half of the county is located in the Piedmont region and consists of gently rolling hills and clay-based soils. The lower half of the county is located in the Upper Atlantic Coastal Plain and is markedly flatter and the soil more sandy. The Flint River marks the entirety of the county's northeastern border.

The county is driven by a largely agricultural economy. Peaches, strawberries, pecans, peanuts, watermelons, and cotton are the most commonly raised crops. Lumbering is also important to the local economy. The county is heavily forested in most areas due in part to the many large plantation pine farms. There are also many desirable hardwood forests, especially along the Flint River basin and tributary streams. The southwestern portion of the county is covered with large sandhills that have given rise to several stable sand mining operations.

The county supports a very healthy population of animals, including white-tailed deer, wild turkey, eastern cottontail, raccoon, coyote, bobcat, nine-banded armadillo, Virginia opossum, red-tailed hawk, and the federally endangered Florida gopher tortoise. Taylor County is home to five of North America's venomous snakes (eastern diamondback rattlesnake, timber rattlesnake, Carolina pygmy rattlesnake, eastern coral snake, water moccasin, and copperhead), representing every North American family of venomous snake.

The dominant tree species are southern red oak, post oak, longleaf pine, loblolly pine, sweetgum, and red maple. Taylor County contains the largest stands of Atlantic white cedar in the state of Georgia. These stands can be found along much of Whitewater and Little Whitewater creeks and are at the heart of a growing movement to conserve these unique plant communities for posterity.

The vast majority of Taylor County is located in the Upper Flint River sub-basin of the ACF River Basin (Apalachicola-Chattahoochee-Flint River Basin), with the exception of a tiny corner of the county just north of Georgia, which is located in the Middle Chattahoochee River-Walter F. George Lake sub-basin of the same ACF River Basin.

Major highways

  U.S. Route 19
  U.S. Route 80
  State Route 3
  State Route 22
  State Route 90
  State Route 96
  State Route 127
  State Route 128
  State Route 137
  State Route 208
  State Route 540 (Fall Line Freeway)

Adjacent counties
 Upson County (north)
 Crawford County (northeast)
 Peach County (east)
 Macon County (southeast)
 Schley County (south)
 Marion County (southwest)
 Talbot County (northwest)

Demographics

2000 census
As of the census of 2000, there were 8,815 people, 3,281 households, and 2,283 families living in the county.  The population density was 23 people per square mile (9/km2).  There were 3,978 housing units at an average density of 10 per square mile (4/km2).  The racial makeup of the county was 55.39% White, 42.56% Black or African American, 0.11% Native American, 0.18% Asian, 0.93% from other races, and 0.82% from two or more races.  1.85% of the population were Hispanic or Latino of any race.

There were 3,281 households, out of which 30.80% had children under the age of 18 living with them, 45.50% were married couples living together, 20.10% had a female householder with no husband present, and 30.40% were non-families. 27.60% of all households were made up of individuals, and 11.10% had someone living alone who was 65 years of age or older.  The average household size was 2.56 and the average family size was 3.12.

In the county, the population was spread out, with 26.90% under the age of 18, 9.00% from 18 to 24, 28.10% from 25 to 44, 22.80% from 45 to 64, and 13.30% who were 65 years of age or older.  The median age was 36 years. For every 100 females there were 95.40 males.  For every 100 females age 18 and over, there were 92.60 males.

The median income for a household in the county was $25,148, and the median income for a family was $30,000. Males had a median income of $30,278 versus $20,241 for females. The per capita income for the county was $13,432.  About 20.20% of families and 26.00% of the population were below the poverty line, including 33.90% of those under age 18 and 24.70% of those age 65 or over.

In the mid-2000s, Taylor County was noted in national news media as being one of the last areas in the South to hold racially segregated proms.  Taylor County High School's first integrated prom was held 2002, but was not repeated the following year. The event was the basis for the 2006 movie For One Night.

2010 census
As of the 2010 United States Census, there were 8,906 people, 3,522 households, and 2,342 families living in the county. The racial makeup of the county was 58.5% white, 39.3% black or African American, 0.6% Asian, 0.1% American Indian, 0.7% from other races, and 0.8% from two or more races. Those of Hispanic or Latino origin made up 1.8% of the population. In terms of ancestry, 17.3% were American, 10.9% were English, and 8.4% were Irish.

Of the 3,522 households, 32.6% had children under the age of 18 living with them, 42.8% were married couples living together, 19.6% had a female householder with no husband present, 33.5% were non-families, and 30.1% of all households were made up of individuals. The average household size was 2.44 and the average family size was 3.04. The median age was 39.7 years.

The median income for a household in the county was $25,237 and the median income for a family was $35,819. Males had a median income of $40,995 versus $25,919 for females. The per capita income for the county was $14,693. About 25.9% of families and 33.1% of the population were below the poverty line, including 39.9% of those under age 18 and 30.7% of those age 65 or over.

2020 census

As of the 2020 United States census, there were 7,816 people, 3,473 households, and 2,208 families residing in the county.

Communities

City
 Butler

Town
 Reynolds

Census-designated place
 Howard

Unincorporated communities
 Mauk
 Rupert
 Charing

Politics

See also

 National Register of Historic Places listings in Taylor County, Georgia
List of counties in Georgia

References

External links
 
 Official Site: http://taylorcountyga.com

 
Georgia (U.S. state) counties
1852 establishments in Georgia (U.S. state)
Populated places established in 1852